Rasbora taytayensis is a species of ray-finned fish in the genus Rasbora which is endemic to Taytay in Palawan.

References

Rasboras
Cyprinid fish of Asia
Freshwater fish of the Philippines
Fish described in 1924